Acherontemys is an extinct genus of turtle from Miocene of United States.

Taxonomy 
It was assigned to Chelydridae by Robert L. Carroll in 1988, while Hutchison classified it within Emydidae in 1992. In 2016, it was placed in Panemydidae by Joyce and Borque.

References

Chelydridae
Extinct animals of the United States
Miocene turtles
Prehistoric turtle genera
Fossil taxa described in 1899